"Shine a Little Love" is a song by the English rock band Electric Light Orchestra (ELO). It was released as a single in the US and UK in 1979.

Summary
The song is the first track on their 1979 album Discovery. This was one of the band's most commercially successful singles, peaking at no. 4 in Canada, no. 6 in the UK Singles Chart and no. 8 in the US Billboard Hot 100. The song subsequently became one of their biggest worldwide hits as well. The 12" release was also available in white vinyl. Two different promotional videos were filmed for the single, a recording studio version shot on 35mm film, minus the band's three string players and a video-taped version made for the Discovery video album, featuring the full touring line-up.

Reception
Billboard praised the song's " catchy melody," "intricate musical techniques, special effects and its "tight, cohesive sound." Cash Box said that it has "seamless production, pinpoint harmonies and Jeff Lynne's smooth, mid-range vocals."  Record World said that it "mixes progressive rock falsetto harmonies and synthesizer swirls with a thumping bass line."

Charts

Weekly charts

Year-end charts

Certifications

B-side
"Jungle" is a song written by Jeff Lynne which first appeared as an album track from the 1977 album Out of the Blue. According to the band members' opinions, recording Jungle was a lot of fun owing to the various types of sound effects, the upbeat tune, and the jungle animal noises provided by Lynne, Bev Bevan, and Kelly Groucutt. Like most songs from the LP, the song starts with a fade in sequence by Tandy then continues in a different tune.

Lovefreekz version

English electronic music producer Mark Hadfield, under the alias of Lovefreekz, sampled the chorus lyric for his version of the song, "Shine". This cover was a commercial success in the United Kingdom, debuting and peaking at no. 6 on the UK Singles Chart in January 2005, matching the peak of the original version. It additionally charted within the top 50 in Australia, Flanders, and Ireland. In the United States, it reached no. 22 on the Billboard Hot Dance Radio Airplay chart.

Charts

Weekly charts

Year-end charts

Release history

References

External links

1979 singles
1979 songs
2005 singles
Electric Light Orchestra songs
Jet Records singles
Positiva Records singles
Song recordings produced by Jeff Lynne
Songs written by Jeff Lynne
Sony Music Australia singles